Antti Sakari Pihlström (born 22 October 1984) is a Finnish professional ice hockey left winger who is currently playing with HPK of the Finnish Liiga.

Playing career
Pihlström played in Finland's SM-liiga for the Espoo Blues, HPK, and SaiPa. On 1 June 2007, Pihlström was signed by the Nashville Predators to a two-year contract.

In the 2007–08 season, his first in North America, Pihlström played primarily for the Predators affiliate the Milwaukee Admirals of the American Hockey League (AHL). He also made his NHL debut playing in one game for the Predators.

He then played at Färjestads BK of the Swedish Hockey League and at JYP in his native Finland, before heading to Russia. After four seasons with Salavat Yulaev Ufa of the Kontinental Hockey League (KHL), Pihlström made a return to North America as free agent in agreeing to attend the Columbus Blue Jackets training camp for the 2015–16 season on a professional try-out contract on 6 September 2015. After being waived, the spent the 2015-16 season with KHL side CSKA Moscow.

On 5 September 2016, he signed a one-month contract with Fribourg-Gotteron of the National League A (NLA), before moving on to Jokerit Helsinki of the Kontinental Hockey League the following month.

International play

Pihlström debuted for Finland national team in the 2008 World Championships with five goals, which lead the Finnish team.

Career statistics

Regular season and playoffs

International

References

External links

1984 births
Living people
HC CSKA Moscow players
Espoo Blues players
Finnish ice hockey left wingers
HC Fribourg-Gottéron players
HPK players
Ice hockey players at the 2014 Winter Olympics
Jokerit players
JYP Jyväskylä players
Medalists at the 2014 Winter Olympics
Milwaukee Admirals players
Nashville Predators players
Olympic bronze medalists for Finland
Olympic ice hockey players of Finland
Olympic medalists in ice hockey
Sportspeople from Vantaa
SaiPa players
Salavat Yulaev Ufa players
Finnish expatriate ice hockey players in Russia
Finnish expatriate ice hockey players in Sweden
Finnish expatriate ice hockey players in Switzerland 
Finnish expatriate ice hockey players in the United States
Undrafted National Hockey League players